Desire (often stylized as Iyanya vs. Desire) is the second studio album by Nigerian singer Iyanya. It was released on 6 February 2013, by Made Men Music Group. The album's production was handled by Tee-Y Mix, D'Tunes, Mr. Chidoo, GospelOnDeBeatz and Young D. It features guest appearances from M.I, Wizkid, D'banj, Emma Nyra, Tiwa Savage, Flavour N'abania, May D, Vector, Tekno and Yung L. The album was supported by six singles—"Kukere", "Kukere" (Remix), "Flavour", "Jombolo", "Ur Waist" and "Sexy Mama".

Background and recording
The meaning behind Desire stems from the concept of one having an alter ego. In a nutshell, Iyanya compares and contrasts his dualistic personalities, saying, "Desire was just an R&B guy with a great voice who took time to write music and talk about his feelings but just a few people appreciate Desire. Desire always begged for shows, hustles for everything but Iyanya is global. Iyanya is accepted by all." Iyanya started working on the album after wrapping up his debut album My Story. He got inspired to record the hit single "Kukere" during a visit to his hometown of Calabar. Iyanya realized the Etighi dance didn't have a unique song to it. In order to popularize the dance, he teamed up with producer D'Tunes to record "Kukere".

Promotion and release
Iyanya and his management team celebrated the album's completion by launching a two-concert series called "Iyanya vs. Desire". The first concert was held at Abuja's International Conference Centre on 24 February 2013, and featured additional performances from D'banj, M.I, Wizkid, Tiwa Savage, Flavour N'abania, May D, Vector, Kcee, Slo-Flo, Addiction, I-Sick and Tekno Miles. The second concert was held at the Eko Hotel & Suites on 2 March 2013; it featured additional performances from D'banj, M.I, Wizkid, Tiwa Savage, Timaya, Flavour N'abania, Davido, Seyi Shay, May D, Bracket, Vector, Iceberg Slim and Lola Rae.

Iyanya promoted the album in the U.K by performing at the Indigo02 Arena and HMV Ritz, in London and Manchester, respectively. The Indigo02 concert was held on 9 June 2013, and the gig at HMV Ritz was held on 14 June 2013.

Singles
The D'Tunes-produced track "Kukere" was released on 4 December 2011, as the album's lead single. Its music video was directed by Patrick Elis. The Emma Nyra-assisted track "Ur Waist" was released on 8 July 2012, as the album's second single. Its music video was directed by Clarence Peters. The D'banj-assisted remix of "Kukere" was released on 20 August 2012, as the album's third single. The D'Tunes-produced track "Flavour" was released on 10 November 2012, as the album's fourth single. The music video for the song was directed by Mr. Moe Musa. "Sexy Mama" and "Jombolo" were released on 6 February and 12 June 2013, as the album's fifth and sixth singles, respectively. The former features vocals by Wizkid and the latter features vocals by Flavour N'abania.

Critical reception

Desire received generally mixed reviews from music critics. A writer for TayoTV assigned 7 stars out of 10, saying some of the tracks on the album were "awesome and some were below par." In a less enthusiastic review, Ayomide Tayo of Nigerian Entertainment Today said the album is "nothing more than a product of the times we live in" and characterized it as a "pop driven LP aimed at pleasing a demography that loves beats and dance, at the expense of lyrics".  Music blog Jaguda gave the album 2.5 stars out of 5, criticizing it for being a "jam-packed project with very shallow and monotonous club and radio friendly cuts which will hold grounds individually but as a body of work, it falls flat on its face." Wilfred Okiche, whose review was posted on the YNaija website, called the album "mediocre" and said majority of the artists on the project "cannot see past their hunger for fame and today’s club banger".

Accolades
Desire was nominated for Album of the Year and Best R&B/Pop Album at The Headies 2013.

Track listing

Personnel

Iyanya – primary artist
 Emma Nyra – featured artist
M.I – featured artist
D'banj – featured artist
Wizkid – featured artist
Tiwa Savage – featured artist 
Flavour N'abania – featured artist
May D – featured artist
Tekno – featured artist
Yung L – featured artist
Tee-Y Mix – producer
D'Tunes – producer
Mr. Chidoo – producer
GospelOnDeBeatz – producer
Young D – producer
Patrick Elis – video director
Mr. Moe Musa – video director
Clarence Peters – video director
Sesan – video director

Release history

References

Iyanya albums
2013 albums
Albums produced by GospelOnDeBeatz
Albums produced by Mr Chidoo
Albums produced by D'Tunes
Albums produced by Tee-Y Mix